The 50th Venice Biennale, held in 2003 (15 June-2 November), was an exhibition of international contemporary art, with 64 participating nations. The Venice Biennale takes place biennially in Venice, Italy. Prizewinners of the 50th Biennale included: Michelangelo Pistoletto and Carol Rama (lifetime achievement), Peter Fischli and David Weiss (best work shown), Oliver Payne and Nick Relph (best young artist), Avish Khebrehzadeh (best young Italian female artist), Luxembourg with Su-Mei Tse (best national participation).

Awards 

 Golden Lion for lifetime achievement: Michelangelo Pistoletto and Carol Rama
 Golden Lion for best national participation: Luxembourg (Su-Mei Tse)
 Golden Lion for best work shown: Peter Fischli and David Weiss
 Golden Lion for artists less than 35 years old: Oliver Payne and Nick Relph
 Golden Lion for young Italian female artist: Avish Khebrehzadeh

References

Bibliography

Further reading 

 
 
 
 
 
 
 
 
 
 https://frieze.com/tags/50th-venice-biennale
 https://www.theguardian.com/artanddesign/2003/jun/17/artsfeatures

2003 in art
2003 in Italy
Venice Biennale exhibitions